Staxx of Joy were a British house music studio project assembled by producers Simon Thorne and Tom Jones.  In the mid-1990s, they had four top 10 hits on the US Hot Dance Music/Club Play chart, two of which reached number 1: "Joy" and "You".  Both of these tracks, and a third single, "Shout", featured vocals by Carol Leeming.  The songs are officially credited to Staxx of Joy featuring Carol Leeming.

A fourth top 10 dance hit, "Temptation", was credited to Staxx.

Discography

See also
List of number-one dance hits (United States)
List of artists who reached number one on the US Dance chart

External links
 "Joy" music video (credited as Staxx)

References

English house music duos
English dance music groups
Male musical duos